Ewan Ashman (born 3 April 2000) is a Scotland international rugby union player. He plays for Sale Sharks in Premiership Rugby. He plays at hooker.

Career

Club
Born in Toronto, Ontario, Ashman started playing rugby at Sandbach RUFC. First playing as a centre or a back row, Ashman eventually became a hooker. 

He made his senior debut for the Cheshire’s club in Midlands Premier during the 2017–18 season, also joining Sale Sharks academy in 2017.

He joined the Sharks' professional squad ahead of the 2018–19 seasons. 

During the next season he was first loaned to Edinburgh as players had left for the World Cup, but never managed to make his professional debut, being blocked by Dave Cherry, Cammy Fenton and Mike Willemse, eventually ending up playing in National League 1 with Sale FC. 

Back with the Sharks, Ashman made his Premiership debuts on the 5 September 2020, coming on as a substitute against Leicester Tigers, in the late post-covid break 2019–20 Premiership Rugby.

On 22 November 2021 it was announced that Ashman would join Glasgow Warriors on loan. He returned to Sale Sharks four days later due to an injury crisis.

International
He played for Scotland since the under 16s, qualifying through his Edinburgh-born father. The young hooker first made the headlines with Scotland U20s, playing the Six Nations and the World championship, where despite Scotland's disappointing run, he appeared as a great prospect, scoring 7 tries and finishing as the world tournament top try scorer.

During the winter, he also took part in the 2020 U20 Six Nations, starting all of Scotland five games, and becoming the top try scorer as his team ended second in this unfinished edition standings.

In the 2020–21 season he earned his first call-ups for the Scotland senior team under Gregor Townsend, both during the Autumn Nations Cup and before the 2021 Six Nations. He earned his first cap and scored his first international try on 7 November 2021 at Murrayfield in a closely won victory over Australia after coming on as an early substitute for George Turner.

International tries

References

External links
 
Sandbach RUFC profile
Sale Sharks profile
Sale FC profile

2000 births
Living people
Scottish rugby union players
Canadian rugby union players
Rugby union hookers
Sale Sharks players
Glasgow Warriors players
Sportspeople from Toronto
Scotland international rugby union players
Anglo-Scots